KPDR may refer to:

 KPDR (FM), a radio station (90.3 FM) licensed to serve Wheeler, Texas, United States
 KPDR-LD, a low-power television station (channel 22, virtual 19) licensed to serve Salt Lake City, Utah, United States